Ji Ju-hyeon (born 11 February 1964) is a South Korean weightlifter. He competed in the men's featherweight event at the 1984 Summer Olympics.

References

1964 births
Living people
South Korean male weightlifters
Olympic weightlifters of South Korea
Weightlifters at the 1984 Summer Olympics
Place of birth missing (living people)